Isra Andja-Diumi Lohata (born 12 June 1989), better known as Wizzy Wow, is a songwriter, musician and music-producer under the Renowned Label. 
He is responsible for such songs as Chipmunk's "Role Model" off the platinum-selling debut album "I Am Chipmunk", Wretch 32's "Never Be Me" featuring Angel from gold-certified "Black and White", Tinie Tempah's "Lucky Cunt" featuring Big Sean off the "Happy Birthday mixtape", Chrisette Michele's "Cherades" featuring 2 Chainz and Taio Cruz's "Dirty Picture" featuring Ke$ha. Other artists he has produced for include Estelle, Roll Deep, Boy Better Know, Mz Bratt and Kano.

Early life 
Born in Sweden of African heritage, Wizzy Wow moved to Tottenham, North London, United Kingdom at the age of 10. He speaks of first being inspired to produce music at the age of twelve after being inspired by South London UK garage collective So Solid Crew. He started out producing on fruity loops, a production software strongly tied to the underground rise of Grime music. Growing up in Tottenham on the notorious Tiverton estate alongside rapper Wretch 32, Wizzy Wow also helped form the Grime Collective 'Combination Chain Gang'. Being a self-taught keys player, Wizzy Wow also studied music at Conel College in Tottenham.

Early career 
Wizzy is most known for his work alongside the UK’s leading Grime pioneers and rap artists from the likes of Kano, Wretch 32, Chipmunk, Roll Deep and Tinie Tempah. Early recognition was given when his productions appeared on Wretch 32’s Wretchrospective mixtape [Be Cool + Be Cool Remix] and Chipmunk’s debut platinum-selling "I Am Chipmunk" album [Role Model + I Am Interval].

Current Works 
He currently produces across a range of musical genres including Hip-Hop, R&B, Grime and bespoke music. His productions have been used for advertising campaigns including ‘Hard Court High’ also featuring Chipmunk for Adidas/Footlocker and Adidas’ and also ‘Take the Stage’ 2012 Olympic Campaign  also featuring Wretch 32. His recent writing collaborations have seen him writing and producing on both sides of the Atlantic with Tinie Tempah, Big Sean, Wretch 32, Taio Cruz, 2 Chainz, Chrisette Michele, Estelle, Kano and Roll Deep, his works have amassed over half a million records sold.

Discography

References

Swedish songwriters
Swedish record producers